Roy S. Herbst (born January 16, 1963) is an American oncologist who is the Ensign Professor of Medicine, Professor of Pharmacology, Chief of Medical Oncology, and Associate Director for Translational Research at Yale Cancer Center and Yale School of Medicine in New Haven, Connecticut.

Education
After earning a BS and MS degree from Yale University, Herbst earned his Doctor of Medicine at Cornell University Medical College and his PhD in Molecular Cell Biology at The Rockefeller University in New York City.  His clinical fellowships in Medicine and Hematology were completed at the Dana–Farber Cancer Institute and Brigham and Women's Hospital, respectively.  Subsequently, he completed a MS degree in Clinical Translational Research at Harvard University in Cambridge, Massachusetts.

Herbst was the Barnhart Distinguished Professor and Chief of the Section of Thoracic Medical Oncology in the Department of Thoracic/Head & Neck Medical Oncology at the University of Texas MD Anderson Cancer Center in Houston, Texas.

Starting in 2011, Herbst has been the Ensign Professor of Medicine, Professor of Pharmacology, Chief of Medical Oncology, and Associate Director for Translational Research at Yale School of Medicine, Yale Cancer Center, and Smilow Cancer Hospital.

Career

Clinical research
Herbst's early career focused on the clinical development of novel targeted agents for the treatment of lung cancer, including the early phase development of therapies targeting the epidermal growth factor receptor and vascular endothelial growth factor receptor signaling pathways for the treatment of lung cancer.

Herbst designed and led the national Biomarker-integrated Approaches of Targeted Therapy for Lung cancer Elimination (BATTLE) clinical trial. He is the national principal investigator of clinical trial "Lung-MAP".

Herbst and his colleagues at Yale did early research on the presence of the immune checkpoint protein PD-L1 in tumors that may dictate response to the immunotherapy atezolizumab. This work earned their team the Herbert Pardes Clinical Research Achievement Award from the Clinical Research Forum, its top award in the US for 2015.

Herbst leads a lung cancer-focused National Cancer Institute specialized programs of research excellence (SPORE) grant at Yale, investigating novel immune based therapies, new methods to combat treatment resistance and understanding mechanisms of brain metastasis.

From 2015 to 2019, he served as Yale's representative Principal Investigator of the Stand Up To Cancer-American Cancer Society Lung Cancer Dream Team.

Professional service
Herbst holds memberships in the American Society of Clinical Oncology, the American Association for Cancer Research and the American College of Physicians.

Select publications
"Selective oral epidermal growth factor receptor tyrosine kinase inhibitor ZD1839 is generally well-tolerated and has activity in non-small-cell lung cancer and other solid tumors: results of a phase I trial"
"Gefitinib in combination with paclitaxel and carboplatin in advanced non-small-cell lung cancer: a phase III trial--INTACT 2"
"Phase I/II trial evaluating the anti-vascular endothelial growth factor monoclonal antibody bevacizumab in combination with the HER-1/epidermal growth factor receptor tyrosine kinase inhibitor erlotinib for patients with recurrent non-small-cell lung cancer"
"Phase II multicenter study of the epidermal growth factor receptor antibody cetuximab and cisplatin for recurrent and refractory squamous cell carcinoma of the head and neck"
"Efficacy of bevacizumab plus erlotinib versus erlotinib alone in advanced non-small-cell lung cancer after failure of standard first-line chemotherapy (BeTa): a double-blind, placebo-controlled, phase 3 trial"

Awards 
 2010, Waun Ki Hong Award for Excellence in Team Science
 2016 Paul A. Bunn, Jr. Scientific Award
 2019, Asclepios Award
 2020, AACR Distinguished Public Service Award for Exceptional Leadership in Cancer Science Policy

References

External links
 National Cancer Institute’s Translational Research Program (TRP), Specialized Programs of Research Excellence in Lung Cancer

1963 births
Living people
American oncologists
Yale School of Medicine faculty
Yale University alumni
Cornell University alumni
Rockefeller University alumni
Harvard University alumni